Simply the Best is a British sports game show that ran from 17 July to 4 September 2004 on ITV. It is hosted by Phil Tufnell and Kirsty Gallacher.

Format
Each week two teams from cities across the UK competed in a series of madcap games to go forward to a final, where the eventual prize was £50,000 for local community projects.

External links

2004 British television series debuts
2004 British television series endings
2000s British game shows
English-language television shows
ITV game shows
Television series by ITV Studios
Television shows produced by Channel Television